William David Hutchinson (March 9, 1916January 27, 2008) was a professional American football quarterback in the National Football League. Hutchinson played in two games for the New York Giants in 1942, completing one pass in four attempts. In those two games, he recorded 27 rushing yards in seven attempts. In 1940, Hutchinson played for the New York Yankees of the third American Football League. He was a member of the AFL's All-League Team in 1940. In 1941 the Yankees, still with Hutchinson, changed their name to the Americans.

References

External links
Bill Hutchinson

1916 births
2008 deaths
American football quarterbacks
Dartmouth Big Green football players
New York Americans (1940 AFL) players
New York Giants players
New York Yankees (1940 AFL) players
Players of American football from New York City
Sportspeople from the Bronx